The northern rivers catfish (Neoarius utarus), also known as the salmon catfish, is a species of catfish in the family Ariidae. It was described by Patricia J. Kailola in 1990, originally under the genus Arius. It inhabits freshwater bodies in Indonesia and Papua New Guinea.

Its diet includes finfish, detritus, terrestrial invertebrates, and caridean shrimp such as those in the genus Macrobrachium.

It is closely related to Neoarius leptaspis, and is frequently mistaken for it.

The Northern rivers catfish spawns throughout the year. It is harvested by subsistence fisheries.

References

Ariidae
Fish described in 1990